Jeff, Geoff or Geoffrey Ellis may refer to:
 Jeff Ellis (plant scientist) (born 1953), Australian plant scientist
 Sir Geoffrey Ellis, 1st Baronet (1874–1956), British politician
 Geoff Ellis (born 1950), Welsh cricketer
 Jeff Ellis (recording engineer) (born 1984), American recording engineer